The Stroop Report is an official report prepared by General Jürgen Stroop for the SS chief Heinrich Himmler, recounting the German suppression of the Warsaw Ghetto Uprising and the liquidation of the ghetto in the spring of 1943. Originally titled The Jewish Quarter of Warsaw Is No More! (Ger. Es gibt keinen jüdischen Wohnbezirk in Warschau mehr!), it was published in the 1960s.

History
The Report was commissioned by Friedrich-Wilhelm Krüger, chief of the SS and police in Kraków and was intended as a souvenir album for Heinrich Himmler. It was prepared in three distinct leather-bound copies for Himmler, Friedrich-Wilhelm Krüger and Jürgen Stroop. One unbound "file" copy of the report (das Konzept) remained in Warsaw, in the care of Chief of Staff Max Jesuiter. According to a statement given in 1945 by Stroop's adjutant Karl Kaleshke to US authorities in Wiesbaden, he ordered Stroop's copy of the report burnt with other secret documents in Burg Kranzberg.

After the war only two of the four copies were discovered, those belonging to Himmler and Jesuiter.  Himmler's copy went to Seventh Army Intelligence Center (SAIC) and Jesuiter's to Military Intelligence Research Section (MIRS) in London. Several sources stated that the German Bundesarchiv also had a copy in Koblenz. But, in reply to inquiries by Richard Raskin, the Bundesarchiv stated that the third copy of report was never in their possession.

The two known copies held by the Allies were introduced as evidence at the International Military Tribunal in Nuremberg, sharing the document number 1061-PS, and used in the trial as "US Exhibit 275". The report was first displayed by the chief U.S. prosecutor Robert H. Jackson for the judges during his opening address. The assistant prosecutor dealing with the persecution of the Jews referred to it as "the finest example of ornate German craftsmanship, leather bound, profusely illustrated, typed on heavy bond paper ... the almost unbelievable recital of the proud accomplishment by Major General of Police Stroop". Both copies were also used in Nuremberg in the 1947 trial of Oswald Pohl, as exhibit 503.

On June 10, 1948, the Himmler/SAIC copy of the Stroop report and Katzmann Report were handed over by Fred Niebergal, head of Office of Chief of Counsel for War Crimes – OCCWC, to Bernard Acht, head of the Polish Military Mission in Nuremberg. It was used in Stroop's trial at Warsaw Criminal District Court in July 1951, and transferred afterwards to the KC PZPR archive. In 1952 it was transferred to the Główna Komisja Badania Zbrodni Hitlerowskich w Polsce (Main Commission for the Investigation of Nazi Crimes in Poland) archive and subsequently to its successor, the Institute of National Remembrance (Polish: Instytut Pamięci Narodowej or IPN), where it remains. In 1948 the Jesuiter/MIRS copy of the report went to the National Archives (NARA) in Washington, D.C., where it continues to be held.

In 2017, the Stroop Report was submitted by Poland and included in UNESCO's Memory of the World Register.

Content

The Report was a 125-page typed document, bound in black pebble leather, with 53 photographs. It consisted of the following sections: 
Summary, with
title page
list of soldiers/Police killed and wounded
the list of combat units involved, and 
Introduction, signed by Jürgen Stroop in the IPN copy 
Collection of 31 daily reports (German: Tägliche Meldungen), sent from Stroop's Chief of Staff Max Jesuiter to SS Police Leader East Friedrich-Wilhelm Krüger. The reports cover the period of 20 April to 16 May 1943, plus a report from 24 May 1943, and all were signed by Jesuiter.
Series of 53 photographs accompanied by hand-written captions in German Sütterlin script
The NARA report also has a fourth section with statistics about human losses, types of recovered weapons, and amounts of money and valuables taken from Jews.

The copies have slight discrepancies in textual and graphical layout, and in the photographs they contain.

Photographs from the Stroop Report 
The IPN copy of the report has 53 photographs on 49 pages, while the NARA copy has the same number of photographs on 52 pages. 37 photographs appear in both copies, although not always with the same size, crop or order and occasionally with different captions. Sixteen shots in each copy are different, although often very similar, as they depict the same events. Altogether, in both versions of the report, there are 69 unique photographs.

The identity of the photographers who accompanied Stroop's headquarters during the operation is unknown. Franz Konrad confessed to taking some of the photographs; the rest were probably taken by photographers from Propaganda Kompanie nr 689. In addition to the photographs found in the reports, there were about 45 additional photographs that were not included. According to Yad Vashem, these were found in Stroop's possession when he was captured by the Americans after the war. Some of those photographs were closely related to those used in the report, as they depicted the same events. Many of those additional photographs are described in reputable sources as coming from the Stroop Report, even if they do not appear in either of the surviving copies.

The high-quality photographs taken for Stroop constitute a unique documentation of the final stage of liquidation of the Warsaw ghetto. The photographer was permitted access to Stroop's inner circle, to accompany the forces that participated in liquidating the ghetto, and to get close to the combat areas. Apart from a dozen candid photographs taken by Polish firefighter Leszek Grzywaczewski, those are the only photographs of the Ghetto Uprising taken inside the ghetto. Some of them became highly recognized images of World War II and the Shoah.

Photographic captions in the Report are often highly racist and contain few facts about their content. They express the mindset of the report's authors. They are written in the German Sütterlin script, and in some cases do not match the images. Many of the places, people and events depicted were not identified until after the report's publication.

Gallery
Photographs included in one of the two copies of the Stroop Report. Image captions include a reference and translation of the original German caption (in red), followed by current photo caption. Click on images for more information.

See also
 Dachau Trials
 Nuremberg Trials

References

External links 
 
  (English translation)
  (IPN copy; Polish translation: pages 23–112 and German original: pages 113–238; photographs)
 (IPN copy; German original and English translation)
 (NARA copy; German original: text, photographs)

 
Government reports
Holocaust historical documents
Memory of the World Register
Operation Reinhard
Warsaw Ghetto Uprising
1943 documents
Holocaust photographs
Books of photographs